Teuku Umar (1854 – February 11, 1899) was a leader of a guerrilla campaign against the Dutch in Aceh during the Aceh War. He fell when Dutch troops launched a surprise attack in Meulaboh. His body was buried in the Mugo area. After Teuku Umar's death, his wife Cut Nyak Dhien continued to lead the guerrillas against the Dutch. He was later made a Pahlawan Nasional Indonesia (National Hero of Indonesia).

Biography

Umar joined the guerrilla forces in 1873 at the age of 19. At first, he fought in Meulaboh; he later expanded his operations to different parts of West Aceh.

At the age of 20, Umar married Nyak Sofia; not long after, he took Nyak Malighai as his second wife. In 1880, Umar married his cousin Cut Nyak Dhien; Dhien later joined him in the guerrilla campaign.

In 1883, the Dutch colonial government signed a peace treaty with the Acehnese guerrillas. That same year Umar joined them as an undercover operative over Dhien's complaints, working his way up through the colonial military's ranks. After war broke out again in 1884, Umar worked to stop the Acehnese people's struggle. For his service, on January 1, 1894, Umar was given the title Johan Pahlawan and control of a legion of 250 fully armed soldiers. Eventually, Umar was given control of 120 more troops as well as 17 lieutenants.

On March 30, 1896, Umar and his troops deserted, taking including 800 weapons, 25,000 bullets,  of ammunition, and 18,000 dollars. Together with 400 soldiers under the command of Teuku Panglima Polem Muhammad Daud, Umar attacked the Dutch forces, killing 25 and injuring 190.

In retaliation, the Dutch governor sent soldiers en masse to capture or kill Umar. Umar was killed in an ambush on February 10, 1899, in Meulaboh.

Legacy

In the 1930s, Sukarno described Teuku Umar as being one of the pahlawan tiga-sekawan (three heroic friends) along with Diponegoro and Imam Bonjol.

Teuku has been officially designated as national hero of Indonesia. There are many streets named after him throughout Indonesia, including a main thoroughfare in the well-known suburb of Menteng in Jakarta, as well as a field in Meulaboh.

References

Bibliography

 

National Heroes of Indonesia
1854 births
1899 deaths
Indonesian Muslims
Acehnese people
History of Aceh